Sondre Guttormsen (born 1 June 1999) is a Norwegian athlete specialising in the pole vault. He won the gold medal at the 2023 European Indoor Championships. Guttormsen earned bronze at the 2021 European Under-23 Championships.

He was the pole vault bronze medallist at the 2016 European U18 Championships. He is a three-time NCAA champion and a four-time Norwegian national champion.

Early life
Sondre Guttormsen was born the oldest of four children in Davis, California to Kristin and Atle Guttormsen. His father, a professor at the Norwegian University of Life Sciences, was studying for an economics Ph.D. at UC Davis. The family then returned to Ski, Norway.

Career
Guttormsen competed for the University of California, Los Angeles in his first year of college and then transfered to Princeton University in 2020.

At the postponed 2020 Tokyo Olympics in 2021, the vaulter suffered a quad injury on his first attempt at 5.65 metres and did not qualify for the final.

With his 2022 NCAA Indoors title, Guttormsen became the first indoor NCAA individual champion for Princeton since 2002.

On 5 March 2023, the 23-year-old won the gold medal at the European Indoor Championships held in Istanbul, Turkey, the biggest success of his career up to that point. A few days later, he became only the ninth European to clear the six metre-mark indoors, set Norwegian outright record and equalled the collegiate record when winning his third NCAA title at the NCAA Division I Indoor T&F Championships.

Statistics

Personal bests
 Pole vault –  (Zürich 2022) =
 Pole vault indoor –  (Albuquerque, NM 2023)

International competitions

NCAA titles
 NCAA Division I Men's Outdoor Track and Field Championships
 Pole Vault: 2022
 NCAA Division I Men's Indoor Track and Field Championships
 Pole Vault: 2022
 Pole Vault: 2023

National titles
 Norwegian Athletics Championships
 Pole Vault: 2018, 2019, 2020
 Norwegian Indoor Athletics Championships
 60 metres hurdles: 2017

References

External links
 
 

1999 births
Living people
People from Ski, Norway
Norwegian male pole vaulters
Norwegian expatriates in the United States
Norwegian Athletics Championships winners
UCLA Bruins men's track and field athletes
Athletes (track and field) at the 2020 Summer Olympics
Olympic athletes of Norway
Sportspeople from Viken (county)
21st-century Norwegian people